The Hardberg transmitter is a transmission tower owned by the Hessischer Rundfunk. It is located on the 593 meters (1,945 ft) high Hardberg mountain on the south tip of Hesse. It is used for radio and formerly TV broadcasting.

The transmitter was first constructed in 1951 as a steel tube pylon. This was replaced in 1988 by a 135 meters high guyed lattice tower.

Coverage
The Hardberg transmitter covers the southern parts of the state of Hesse, including the city of Darmstadt, the Bergstraße area and some southern parts of the Odenwald mountain range. Its signal reaches very far to the south, up to and including the city of Stuttgart and the areas beyond, as well as the west. Generally, its coverage area overlaps a lot with Großer Feldberg transmitter.

Channels
Analog radio:
hr1 - 90.6 MHz (50 kW)
hr3 - 92.7 MHz (50 kW)
hr4 - 101.6 MHz (50 kW)
YOU FM - 95.3 MHz (50 kW)
Analog television (no longer on air)
VHF 5 - ARD (10 kW)

Digital television is not transmitted from here, because of the coverage overlap mentioned above.

References

 

Radio masts and towers in Germany
1951 establishments in West Germany
Towers completed in 1951